The United States Army Corps of Engineers South Pacific Division (SPD) is an Army organization providing civil works and military water resource services/infrastructure. It also supports economically viable and environmentally sustainable watershed management and water resources development in California, Arizona, Nevada, Utah and New Mexico and is also responsible for parts of Oregon, Idaho, Wyoming, Colorado and Texas.  It is headquartered in San Francisco, California.

The South Pacific Division has four districts:

Albuquerque District
Los Angeles District
Sacramento District
San Francisco District

The Division Commander is directly responsible to the Chief of Engineers.  Within the authorities delegated, the SPD Commander directs and supervises the individual District Commanders.  SPD duties include:

 Preparing engineering studies and design.
 Constructing, operating, and maintaining flood control and river and harbor facilities and installations.
 Administering the laws on civil works activities.
 Acquiring, managing, and disposing of real estate.
 Mobilization support of military, natural disaster, and national emergency operations.

External links
USACE South Pacific Division

This page incorporates public domain text from the South Pacific Division website.

Divisions of the United States Army Corps of Engineers